The following are the national records in athletics in Wallis and Futuna maintained by its local athletics federation: Wallis & Futuna Athletics Association (Ligue d'athlétisme de Wallis et Futuna).

Outdoor

Key to tables:

ht = hand timing

Men

†: Result obtained during decathlon

Women

Indoor

Men

Women

References

Wallis and Futunan
records
Athletics